Lars Lilholt  (born in Herlev, Denmark on 14 March 1953) is a Danish singer, violinist, guitarist and composer.

Career

Kræn Bysted's
In the early 1970s, he was part of Kræn Bysted's, a Danish acoustic folk, electric folk and rock group made up of Lars Lilholt, Jacob Ohrt and Lars Dam, all from Aalborg. The singer Inger Nyholm from Silkeborg joined in 1975 and drummer Jens Jørgen Pedersen in 1977. The group had various bass players contributing including Jakob Dalsgaard, Karsten Kongsøre, Johs Stærk and Ole Grønbæk.

Lars Lilholt Band
He performs with his band Lars Lilholt Band. In 1982, he released album , his first solo album. He formed Lars Lilholt Band the following year made up of Lars Lilholt, Tine Lilholt, Kristian Lilholt, Gert Vincent and Tommy Kejser. When Kejser became manager of the band, he was replaced by Tom Bilde (from Mek Pek Partyband)

The band has seen many changes and the present set-up is made up of Lars Lilholt (vocals, violin, guitar), Gert Vincent (electric guitar), Klaus Thrane (drums, percussion), Tom Bilde (bass), Kristian Fogh (keyboard) and Eskild Dohn (trumpet, saxophone).

Lilholt has written hundreds of songs, but by far the most famous is "Kald det kærlighed" (meaning Call it love).

Dalton
He was also part of a Danish supergroup named Dalton made up of Lilholt, Johnny Madsen and Allan Olsen. It was formed in 1983 but had to wait till 1992 for their first album Dalton. They reunited in 2005 to work on new materials and had a comeback in 2010 for a grand tour.

Discography

Albums

Lars Lilholt

Lars Lilholt Band

Albums with other bands
In Spillemændene fra Himmerland
1975: Liegstouw

Kræn Bysted's
1975: Gammel dansk MC
1977: Kræn Bysteds
1978: Den anden Kræn
1980: Stavnsbundet

Dalton
 1992: Dalton
 2009: Tyve Ti
 2010: Var Her

Singles

References

External links

 Official Lars Lilholt Band website
 
 

Danish folk music groups
Danish violinists
Male violinists
Danish composers
Male composers
1953 births
Living people
21st-century violinists
21st-century Danish male singers
People from Herlev Municipality